is Pink Lady's third single release in Japan. Inspired by the novella Carmen, the song was written by Yū Aku and Shunichi Tokura, and was released on March 10, 1977. The single sold in excess of 1,100,000 copies, and reached the number-one position on the Oricon charts in April 1977, and maintained its place at number one for five weeks. It also reached the number-one position on the Japanese Music Labo charts.

The song's dance choreography incorporates elements of flamenco and European marionette theatre. Traditionally, Mie and Kei wore white dresses decorated with roses while performing this song.

According to Oricon it was the seventh best selling single from 1977.

A re-recorded version of the song was included on the two-disc greatest hits release, Innovation, released in December 2010.

Track listing (7" vinyl)
All lyrics are written by Yū Aku; all music is composed and arranged by Shunichi Tokura.

Chart positions

Covers
 Speed covered the song for the 1997 Yū Aku tribute album VELFARRE J-POP NIGHT presents DANCE with YOU.
 Trasparenza covered the song in their 2002 album Pink Lady Euro Tracks.
 Korean duo Red Pepper Girls covered the song in 2008.
 Ruriko Kubō and Kyōko (formerly of the Barbee Boys) recorded a cover version for the 2009 Pink Lady/Yū Aku tribute album Bad Friends''.
 In 2019, Momoiro Clover Z recorded their version of the song titled  to promote Radisma Hybrid Radio, an Internet-based FM radio service.

References

External links
 
 

1977 singles
1977 songs
Pink Lady (band) songs
Japanese-language songs
Disco songs
Oricon Weekly number-one singles
Songs with lyrics by Yū Aku
Songs with music by Shunichi Tokura
Victor Entertainment singles